In cricket, a five-wicket haul (also known as a "five–for" or "fifer") refers to a bowler taking five or more wickets in a single innings. This is regarded as a significant achievement, and there have been only 10 instances of a bowler taking a fifer in ICC Champions Trophy tournaments. The ICC Champions Trophy is a One Day International (ODI) tournament organised by the International Cricket Council (ICC), and is considered the second most significant after the World Cup. Originally inaugurated as the "ICC Knock Out Trophy" in 1998, the tournament has been organised every two or three years since.

, 11 players from 7 different nations have taken fifers. South Africa's Jacques Kallis was the first to take a five-wicket haul in the tournament, while playing against West Indies in the final of the inaugural edition. His bowling figures of 5 wickets for 30 runs in the final helped South Africa win the tournament. The figures also secured a place in the "Top 100 bowling performances of all-time", a list released by the Wisden Cricketers' Almanack in 2002. As of 2013, the South Africans have taken the most fifers with three followed by the Australians and the New Zealanders with two. India, Pakistan and Sri Lanka each have one, while Bangladesh, England and Zimbabwe are yet to see a player take a fifer in the tournament. Sri Lanka's Farveez Maharoof holds the record for the best bowling figures: 6 wickets for 14 runs – also his career best figures – against West Indies in the 2006 tournament. Australia's Josh Hazlewood is the most recent player to take a fifer. His figures of 6 wickets for 52 runs came against New Zealand in 2017.

Key

Five-wicket hauls

References

Bibliography

 

ICC Champions Trophy
Five-wicket hauls
Five-wicket hauls
Five-wicket hauls